The City Livery Club is a members-only club in the  City of London which was established in June 1914. It is currently based at 42 Crutched Friars, in the City of London, a site which it shares with the City University Club.  The Club is open to men and women.

The club was founded "to bind together in one organisation liverymen of the various guilds in the bond of civic spirit, in service to the Ancient Corporation and in the maintenance of the priceless City Churches," and it serves primarily as a social and lunching club for those working in the City. While membership was originally open only to City liverymen, it has since grown to include liverymen and freemen of the livery companies, as well as assorted categories of associate membership. The incumbent Lord Mayor of London is automatically elected patron of the club.

The City Livery Club has led something of a peripatetic existence, occupying the De Keyser's Royal Hotel on the Victoria Embankment from 1914 to 1923. It then moved to Williamson's Hotel on Bow Lane, off Cheapside, until 1927, when it moved to the Chapter House in St Paul's Churchyard. This site was bombed during the Blitz in 1940, and temporary lodgings were occupied at Butchers' Hall in Bartholomew Close between 1941 and 1944 until that too was bombed. Its post-War situation was somewhat more permanent, with the 1944 move to Sion College on the Embankment. The 1996 closure of much of the college meant that new premises had to be found – at the Insurance Hall on Aldermanbury, and the club moved again to the Baltic Exchange on St. Mary Axe in 2003. It was most recently based in the premises of the Little Ship Club on Bell Wharf Lane.

References
Anthony Lejeune, The Gentlemen's Clubs of London (Macdonald and Jane's, London, 1979) pp. 102–3

External links
City Livery Club website

Gentlemen's clubs in London
1914 establishments in England